Kærbygård is a manor house and a listed building in Aarhus Municipality, Denmark. The manor was built in 1768 and was listed by the Danish Heritage Agency on 16 April 1990. The estate has been an active farm since it was built.

The Kærbygård farm was moved to its present location north of Egå and the village of Kasted in 1680. In 1768 the original 3 winged half-timbered estate was built. In 1880 the facades facing the courtyard were renovated and rebuilt in brick, originally with exposed red bricks, but today whitewashed with neo-renaissance elements. In 1928 two parallel brick buildings for livestock were built in front of the manor building, held in yellow and red and with characteristic crow-stepped gables.

References

External links 
 

Listed buildings and structures in Aarhus Municipality
Manor houses in Denmark
Houses completed in 1768
Listed castles and manor houses in Denmark
1768 establishments in Denmark